President, number 103, and Alliance, number 104 were locomotives of the Great Western Railway. George Jackson Churchward, Chief Mechanical Engineer of the Great Western Railway, was given authority to purchase three French de Glehn-du Bousquet four-cylinder compound locomotives, in order to evaluate the benefits of compounding. The first locomotive, no.102 La France, was delivered in 1903.  Two further locomotives, nos. 103 and 104, were purchased in 1905. These were similar to the Paris-Orleans Railway's 3001 class, and slightly larger than 102. As with no. 102, these were built by Société Alsacienne de Constructions Mécaniques. They had two low-pressure cylinders fitted between the frames, and two high-pressure cylinders outside. The low-pressure cylinders drove the front driving wheels while the high-pressure cylinders drove the rear driving wheels. An external steam pipe was mounted just in front of the dome, looking rather similar in appearance to a top feed. In 1907 No. 104 was fitted with an unsuperheated Swindon No. 1 boiler, President herself being similarly reboilered in February 1910 and receiving a superheated boiler in January 1914. In 1926, the three locomotives were based at Oxford shed. 
In practice, they did not provide any significant improvement in either performance or economy compared to No 171 Albion, Churchward's prototype 4-6-0, which was converted to a 4-4-2 specifically for comparison with the French locomotives.

References

Bibliography
 
 
 
 

0103
Individual locomotives of Great Britain
4-4-2 locomotives
Compound locomotives
Standard gauge steam locomotives of Great Britain
Railway locomotives introduced in 1905
SACM locomotives
De Glehn compound locomotives
2′B1 n4v locomotives
Passenger locomotives